Charles de Chambrun (1930–2010) was a French politician.

Early life
Charles de Chambrun was born on June 16, 1930 in Paris, France. His grandfather Pierre de Chambrun and uncle, Gilbert de Chambrun, were politicians. He was a direct descendant of Gilbert du Motier, Marquis de Lafayette.

Career
De Chambrun served as Secretary of Foreign Trade from February 1966 to March 1967 under Prime Minister Georges Pompidou and President Charles de Gaulle. He served as a member of the National Assembly from 1968 to 1972, representing Lozère. After joining the National Front, he served again from 1986 to 1988, representing Gard. He was elected as the mayor of Saint-Gilles in 1992.

Death
De Chambrun died on October 21, 2010 in Tunis, Tunisia at the age of 80.

References

1930 births
2010 deaths
Politicians from Paris
Popular Republican Movement politicians
Union for the New Republic politicians
Union of Democrats for the Republic politicians
National Rally (France) politicians
Deputies of the 2nd National Assembly of the French Fifth Republic
Deputies of the 3rd National Assembly of the French Fifth Republic
Deputies of the 4th National Assembly of the French Fifth Republic
Deputies of the 8th National Assembly of the French Fifth Republic
Mayors of places in Occitania (administrative region)
Government ministers of France